Alpi Aviation srl is an Italian aircraft manufacturer based in Pordenone. The company specializes in the design and manufacture of light aircraft in the form of kits for amateur construction and ready-to-fly aircraft in the European Fédération Aéronautique Internationale microlight category.

The company produces a range of both fixed-wing and rotary-wing aircraft, both manned and unmanned. These include the Alpi Pioneer 200 and 230, the 300, the aerobatic 330 microlights and the four seat 400 kit aircraft. The 200 and 300 series are built from a combination of wood and composites. The company also manufactures the Syton AH 130 turbine-powered helicopter which is derived from the Rotorway Exec. Alpi also markets the Alpi Strix-C fixed-wing mini unmanned aerial vehicle and the Alpi Sixton-A rotary-wing micro unmanned aerial vehicle.

Aircraft

References

External links

Aircraft manufacturers of Italy
Ultralight aircraft
Homebuilt aircraft
Unmanned aerial vehicle manufacturers of Italy